Teen Thay Bhai is a 2011 Indian comedy film directed by Mrighdeep Lamba, produced by Rakeysh Omprakash Mehra Productions and PVR Pictures. The film stars Om Puri, Shreyas Talpade, Deepak Dobriyal, Ragini Khanna and Yograj Singh.

Plot
Teen Thay Bhai is the story of 3 brothers separated for many years and reunited by their grandfather's will.

The story starts with an introduction of three brothers. The eldest Chixie Gill (Om Puri), is a small-time shop owner with 3 obese daughters whom no one wants to marry and a nagging wife (whom he would like to send back to her parents house). He dreamed of opening a big cloth store in his younger days but their grandfather was not ready to sell their village land for the money needed. The middle brother, Happy Gill (Deepak Dobriyal) is a dentist who has only one diagnosis for any tooth ailment, shifting pain. As a result, he has no patients but a long line of creditors (whose teeth he has removed more than once). He wants to get rid of all his debts and open a big dry-cleaning shop. He was in love with Gurleen Kaur (Ragini Khanna) in his younger days when they got separated. The youngest, Fancy Gill (Shreyas Talpade) is an aspiring actor who wants to go Hollywood, but only gets roles in Punjabi cinema, where his habit of putting in disco and English dialogues leads to him being thrown out quite often.
 
On the death of their grandfather, by the requirement of his will, they need get together for 3 years on the day of his death anniversary before midnight at the cabin. If not, the property around the cabin (worth crores of rupees) will be forfeited. Also every year one of them has to take care of their grandfather's ashes starting from the eldest and pass it on to the next younger on that day. For the much needed money, they somehow manage to make it through two years, but the last year holds a lot for them. Snowstorms, trespassers, foreign babes with drugs etc. bring them close to each other and make up their differences.

Cast
Om Puri as Chixie Gill
Deepak Dobriyal as Happy Gill
Shreyas Talpade as Fancy Gill
Ragini Khanna as Gurleen Kaur
Yograj Singh as Khetarpal Gill

Production

Casting
According to Rakeysh Omprakash Mehra, "Omji, Deepak and Shreyas suited the roles perfectly. Given the age difference, the eldest brother is a fatherly figure. And their chemistry, or the lack of it, becomes pivotal for the story to be told."

Filming
The film was shot at Gulmarg, Baramula district, Kashmir in 44 days.

Critical reception
Anupama Chopra of NDTV wrote "Debutant director Mrighdeep Singh Lamba strains hard to make you laugh – Teen Thay Bhai includes everything from fart jokes to a purposefully loud Ram Leela – but I barely smiled" and gave it 1.5 stars out of five.

Soundtrack
The music is composed by Sukhwinder Singh, Daler Mehndi, Rajat Dholakia, and Ranjit Barot. Lyrics are penned by Gulzar. The music is primarily bhangra style highly influenced by western music.

Track listing

References

External links

2011 films
2010s Hindi-language films